Maurice Carter (born October 12, 1976) is an American former professional basketball player.

A 6'5" guard from Louisiana State University, Carter played ten games for the Los Angeles Lakers and New Orleans Hornets during the 2003-04 NBA season. He later played in Spain.

Carter played for the Dakota Wizards of the Continental Basketball Association (CBA) during the 2003–04 season. He was named the Finals Most Valuable Player and selected to the All-CBA Second Team.

References

1976 births
Living people
ABA All-Star Game players
American expatriate basketball people in Greece
American expatriate basketball people in Italy
American expatriate basketball people in Spain
American men's basketball players
Basketball players from Jackson, Mississippi
CB Girona players
Charlotte Bobcats expansion draft picks
Dakota Wizards (CBA) players
Kansas City Knights players
Leones de Ponce basketball players
Liga ACB players
Los Angeles Lakers players
LSU Tigers basketball players
New Orleans Hornets players
Pallacanestro Virtus Roma players
Peristeri B.C. players
Rio Grande Valley Vipers players
San Diego Stingrays players
Shooting guards
St. Louis Swarm players
Undrafted National Basketball Association players
Yakima Sun Kings players